Lynk Global is a company developing a satellite-to-mobile-phone satellite constellation that aims to provide a "cell tower in space" capability for global mobile phone service coverage, including in underserved rural areas without cellular coverage.

Lynk has requested a license from the US Federal Communications Commission to launch up to ten test satellites as early as 2022, with the goal to begin continuous global coverage in 2025 using a constellation of several thousand satellites.

History 
Lynk Global Inc. was founded in 2017 by Charles Miller, Margo Deckard, and Tyghe Speidel.
The business plan for Lynk came out of a multi-year effort to look for the killer app for small satellites, specifically satellites as small as cubesat-class nanosatellites, which led to the concept of connecting a satellite directly to a mobile phone.  The idea had been thought to not be possible by some, but the Lynk concept and patents gave Lynk founders and investors confidence it was achievable.
Lynk raised  from investors during early years and expects to raise a  round later in 2021.

In February 2020, Lynk "sent the world's first text message from a satellite in orbit to a standard mobile phone on the ground" in a test supported by both NASA and several mobile network operators.

On 25 May 2021, Lynk filed with the US telecommunications regulator, the FCC, to license Lynk's satellites and multiple satellite launches, with the goal to enable global mobile connectivity from space-based assets.

By May 2021, Lynk had launched four "cell-tower-in-space" test satellites into orbit. The fifth one, Shannon, was launched on 29 June 2021 and is a test sat of a new design suitable for mass production. Shannon is larger and operates at a higher power level and greater telecom capacity than the earlier test satellites. According to Lynk, the design is capable of being scaled up to provide greater communications throughput.

Technology 
According to the company, Lynk satellite mobile technology is capable of connecting to standard mobile phones from satellites in -altitude orbits.

Lynk technology connects to mobile phones on the ground in a way similar to roaming networks, where the satellite mobile service will connect to another available cellular network when outside the range of its home network. To accomplish the regulatory side of this novel telecommunications method will require that Lynk work through the various geographically dispersed, and often country-specific, mobile network operators in any area of the world in which the service is to be  available.

Satellites launched
The first Lynk payloads to be tested in space have been flown attached to Cygnus spacecraft following their departure from the ISS. The first was tested on Cygnus NG-10 in February 2019, the second on Cygnus NG-11 in August 2019 and the third on Cygnus NG-12 in January 2020. Those have been followed by two free-flying test satellites, Lynk 04 ULTP and Lynk 06 Shannon, that have been launched on Falcon 9 Block 5 rockets in March 2020 and June 2021 respectively. The launch of operational satellites, named Lynk Towers, started in April 2022 with 3 satellites launched as of January 2023.

See also 
 Satellite internet constellation

References

External links 
 Official website

Communications satellite operators
Satellite constellations
Satellite telephony
Telecommunications companies of the United States